Charles Allen House may refer to:

Charles Allen House (Christiana, Delaware), listed on the National Register of Historic Places (NRHP)
Charles Allen House (Worcester, Massachusetts), NRHP-listed

See also
Allen House (disambiguation)